Invitational education (IE) is an educational theory of practice introduced by co-founders William Watson Purkey and Betty Siegel of the International Alliance for Invitational Education (IAIE). Purkey is professor emeritus of counselor education at the University of North Carolina at Greensboro and writes on the topic of school improvement. John Novak, professor emeritus at Brock University in Ontario, Canada, is also a primary contributor to the development of Invitational Theory and Practice, authoring numerous books on the subject and lecturing internationally.

IE emphasizes the importance of internal knowledge in relation to external connections to the outside world and existing educational systems. A key feature of IE is positive self-concept developed through a school environment that leads to more productivity.

Concept

Purkey writes, "At its heart, Invitational Education is an imaginative act of hope that explains how human potential can be realized. It identifies and changes the forces that defeat and destroy people. Invitational Education is designed to create and enhance human environments that cordially summon people to realize their potential in all areas of worthwhile human endeavor." "Invitational Education asserts that organizations are never neutral. Everything and everybody either adds to or subtracts from an existing culture. Invitational Education offers concrete, practice, safe, successful and democratic solutions for problems that routinely harm organizations and the people within them." 

One of the concepts that Purkey explained is that educators need to create a Personal "Fort Knox" in order to remember the positive aspects of teaching. This might include all of your positive letters from past students, colleagues, etc. Teaching can be a demanding career and it is crucial that educators remember the positive impact they can have on others and why they have decided to dedicate their live to teaching.

Five Domains

IE recognizes five "domains" which comprise everyone and every thing in an organization. The domains include People, Places, Policies, Programs and Processes. These domains will either build or destroy intellectual, social, physical, emotional and moral potential for stakeholders. Adjusting these domains, Invitational Education's theory and practices have been embedded in schools around the world at all levels, from nursery schools to universities. In addition, IE has strengthened health care facilities, businesses, non-profits, worship centers and families.

In Visible Learning, John Hattie's meta-analysis of school improvement research, Hattie writes that Invitational Education "is not 'niceness' at work, but an approach that places much reliance on the teachers and schools to make learning exciting, engaging, and enduring. Where there are school differences, it is these types of effects that are the most powerful." Hattie's research determined that many of the most hotly debated school reform efforts had little effect on school improvement, but those which provide in invitation to learn had the most profound effect.

Also applying Invitational Education are authors Harry and Rosemary Wong. In their book, The First Days of School, the Wongs explain that effective teachers invite their students and their colleagues to learn together. "An invitation makes a person feel able, responsible and valuable. Effective teachers have the power and the ability to maintain an inviting stance in the classroom."

References

External links

Education theory